Phineas is a masculine given name. Notable people with the name include:

 Phineas, an Anglicized name for the priest Phinehas in the Hebrew Bible
 King Phineas, the first king of the Beta Israel in Ethiopia
 Phineas Banning (1830–1885), American businessman and entrepreneur
 P. T. Barnum (1810–1891), American showman and businessman
 Phineas Bowles (died 1722), British Army major-general
 Phineas Bowles (1690–1749), British Army lieutenant-general and Member of Parliament; son of the above
 Phineas F. Bresee (1838–1915), American founder of the Church of the Nazarene
 Phineas Bruce (1762–1809), American politician
 Phineas Clanton (1843–1906), American Old West cattle rustler and brother of outlaws Billy and Ike Clanton
 Phineas Davis (1792–1835), American clockmaker and inventor who designed and built the first practical American coal-burning locomotive
 Phineas Fisher, an unidentified hacktivist
 Phineas Fletcher (1582–1650), Scottish-English poet
 Phineas Gage (1823–1860), American railroad construction foreman whose personality was changed by an accident that destroyed part of his brain
 Phineas Hitchcock (1831–1881), American politician
 Phineas Hodson (died 1646), Anglican clergyman and Chancellor of York from 1611 to 1646
 Phineas Jones (1819–1884), American politician
 Phineas Jenks (1781–1851), American doctor and politician
 Phineas C. Lounsbury (1841–1925), American politician and 53rd Governor of Connecticut
 Phineas W. Leland (1798–1870), American physician, journalist and politician
 Phineas Lovett (1745–1828), farmer, merchant, judge and political figure in Nova Scotia (now part of Canada)
 Phineas Lyman (1716–1774), colonial American soldier
 Phineas Newborn, Jr. (1931–1989), American jazz pianist
 Phineas Paist (1873–1937), American architect
 Phineas Pett (1570–1647), English shipwright
 Phineas Parkhurst Quimby (1802–1866), American religious teacher, philosopher, magnetizer, mesmerist, healer, inventor and writer
 Phineas Riall (1775–1850), British general and Governor of Grenada
 Phineas Ryrie (1829–1892), Scottish tea merchant in Hong Kong
 Phineas J. Stone (1810–1891), American politician
 Phineas L. Tracy (1786–1876), American politician
 Phineas White (1770–1847), American lawyer and politician
 Phineas Young (1799–1879), Mormon pioneer and missionary, older brother of Brigham Young

Fictional characters
 Phineas Nigellus Black, from the Harry Potter series of novels
 Phineas Bogg, a character in Voyagers!
 Phineas T. Bluster, from  The Howdy Doody Show 
 Phineas Finn, in Anthony Trollope's novels Phineas Finn and Phineas Redux
 Phineas Flynn, in Phineas and Ferb
 Phineas T. Freakears, in Fabulous Furry Freak Brothers
 Phineas Horton, a Marvel Comics character
 Phineas Sharp, in Darkwing Duck
 Phineas, in Allies in Power Rangers: Mystic Force
 Phineas or Fyneas a tragic character in the 1959 novel A Separate Peace
 Phineas Welles, a mad scientist in action role-playing game The Outer Worlds
 Dr. Phineas Mogg, the father of Kenny Mogg(YK-9) in the 2003 Nickelodeon animated series My Life as a Teenage Robot

See also

 Finneas, American singer-songwriter, record producer, and actor
 Phineas Priesthood, Christian identity movement

 Phinehas (disambiguation)
 Phineus (disambiguation)
 Philip

English masculine given names
Hebrew masculine given names
Masculine given names